Highway 169 (AR 169, Ark. 169, and Hwy. 169) is a designation for three state highways in Southeast Arkansas. One route of  begins at Sulphur Springs and runs northeast to Hancock Road in Crossett. A third route of  begins at US 165 and runs east to Arkansas Post. All routes are maintained by the Arkansas Department of Transportation (ArDOT).

Route description

Sulphur Springs to Crossett
The route runs northeast to Crossett, passing through an industrial section of town. Continuing north, the route intersects and overlaps US 82 at a brief officially designated exception heading west. At Hancock Road, Highway 169 turns north and runs along the west side of a large Georgia-Pacific paper mill. State maintenance ends, with the roadway continuing north at Hancock Road.

McGehee
Highway 169 begins at Highway 4 in the southeastern part of McGehee near the McGehee Cemetery. The route curves northwest to US 65/US 165, where it terminates.

US 165 to Arkansas Post
The route begins at US 165 in southern Arkansas County near the Arkansas River. Highway 169 runs east toward Moore Bayou, serving the Moore Bayou Use Area owned by the Arkansas Game and Fish Commission. Continuing east, the route bridges Little Post Bayou and enters Arkansas Post National Memorial. State maintenance terminates near the location of the first established European settlement in Arkansas, settled in 1868 when the area was under French dominion as French Louisiana. Arkansas Post served as the capitol of Arkansas Territory and was an important trading post in early Arkansas history.

History

The highway was created between 1936 and 1937 as a connection between State Road 1 and Arkansas Post. The second section of Highway 169 was created in Crossett on July 18, 1985. The route was designated to provide access to the state highway system for an industrial facility. The Crossett route was extended south on February 18, 1998, supplanting one of the three sections of Highway 278 (because US 278 was extended into Arkansas). The third section of Highway 169 was created on September 27, 2000, by supplanting a short section of Highway 4 in order to reduce confusion.

Major intersections

Former route

Route description
The route began at US 79 in Humphrey and ran to Highway 13.

History
A second segment of Highway 169 was created between Humphrey and the Arkansas/Jefferson county line on March 28, 1973 pursuant to Act 9 of 1973 by the Arkansas General Assembly at the request of the Arkansas County Judge. This request came during a time when Arkansas State Highway Commission was seeking to close gaps in the state highway system. Since the Arkansas County section left a  gap between the end of Highway 169 and Highway 13 in Jefferson County, the ASHC extended the request to Highway 13. The entire route was supplanted by a rerouted Highway 13 on June 22, 1977.

Major intersections

See also

References

External links

169
Transportation in Arkansas County, Arkansas
Transportation in Ashley County, Arkansas
Transportation in Desha County, Arkansas